The American Football Federation of the Philippines (AFFP) is a non-profit organization in the Philippines founded in October 2011. Its first team, the Philippine Punishers, was composed of Filipinos, Fil-Americans, and expatriates.

History
The Philippine Punishers started with about 15 players, headed by Coach Tim Beasley.

When the team was founded, the Punishers played two home games against the Guam All-Stars in April 2012 and defeating the Hong Kong Cobras, finishing a score of 42–14 on 5 May of the same year in Clark, Pampanga. After winning the game against the Cobras, the Punishers won with their rematch in July 2012, by a score of 32-12. The team also traveled to Beijing in August 2012 to beat the Beijing Guardians 14–0. The following months, the Punishers did a 13-6 victory over the Sharks Saipan in Manila.

In 2013, the AFFP produced the Philippine Valkyries, its first Philippine women's tackle football, started by five players. The team is now composed of 30 members.

Philippine Punishers 

Philippine Punishers is composed of Filipinos, Americans, Australians, Chinese and Canadians whose age ranges from 18 to 43. The players vary from 4'11" up to 6'7".

The Philippine Punishers came into the international scene in Asia by playing against established organizations such as the Beijing Guardians, Hong Kong Cobras (twice), Guam All-Stars and Saipan Sharks. They had a very successful year by posting a 4–1 win/loss record even though 85% of the Filipino players have less than 1 year of playing experience.

Philippine Valkyries 

The Philippine Valkyries were the first Women's American Football Team established in the Philippines. It is a full-contact American Football team member of American Football Federation of the Philippines, also known as AFFP.

Founded in 2013, Coach Tim Beasley, AFFP Director, started an American Football clinic held in ASCOM and exclusive for females ranging from 19 years old and above.  In January 2014, the Philippine Valkyries competed against Guam Gridiron Divas in Quezon City.

References 

American football in the Philippines
2011 establishments in the Philippines
Sports organizations established in 2011